The 20th annual Venice International Film Festival was held from 23 August to 6 September 1959.

Jury
 Luigi Chiarini (Italy) (head of jury)
 Georges Altman (France)
 Sergei Bondarchuk (Soviet Union)
 Ralph Forte (USA)
 Luis Gómez Mesa (Spain)
 Ernst Kruger (West Germany)
 Roger Maxwell (UK)
 Vinicio Marinucci (Italy)
 Dario Zanelli (Italy)

Films in competition

Awards
Golden Lion:
The Great War (Mario Monicelli)
General della Rovere (Roberto Rossellini)
Special Jury Prize:
The Magician (Ingmar Bergman)
Volpi Cup:
 Best Actor - James Stewart - (Anatomy of a Murder)
 Best Actress - Madeleine Robinson  - (Web of Passion)
Special Mention - Carla Gravina, Lucyna Winnicka, Hannes Messemer & Alberto Sordi (Esterina, Night Train, General della Rovere & The Great War)
New Cinema Award
The Magician (Ingmar Bergman)
FIPRESCI Prize
Ashes and Diamonds (Andrzej Wajda)
OCIC Award
General della Rovere (Roberto Rossellini)
Pasinetti Award
The Magician (Ingmar Bergman)
Parallel Sections - Come Back, Africa (Lionel Rogosin)

References

External links
 
 Venice Film Festival 1959 Awards on IMDb

Venice International Film Festival
Venice International Film Festival
Venice Film Festival
Film
Venice International Film Festival
Venice International Film Festival